The Royal Canadian Navy (RCN) is tasked to provide maritime security along the Pacific, Atlantic and Arctic coasts of Canada, exercise Canada's sovereignty over the Arctic archipelago, and support Canada's multi-national and bilateral interests overseas. It comprises the Pacific Fleet at Canadian Forces Base (CFB) Esquimalt, and the Atlantic Fleet at CFB Halifax. CFB Esquimalt is on Vancouver Island, in British Columbia, and is home to 15 vessels and 6,000 staff, the headquarters for Maritime Forces Pacific, His Majesty's Canadian (HMC) Dockyard Esquimalt, Fleet Maintenance Facility – Cape Breton (FMF-CB), Fire Fighting and Damage Control School, the Naval Officer Training Centre (NOTC Venture), and extensive housing. CFB Halifax is home port for the 18 vessels of the Canadian Atlantic Fleet and situated in Halifax, Nova Scotia. CFB Halifax employs 7,000 civilians and military staff, and hosts the Canadian Atlantic Fleet headquarters, HMC Dockyard Halifax, FMF Cape Scott, extensive maritime research facilities, an ammunition depot, and the four maritime squadrons of the Royal Canadian Air Force that deploy helicopters aboard ships. The Canadian Armed Forces are currently constructing a new naval facility at Nanisivik, Baffin Island, to provide a summer port for RCN patrols in the Canadian arctic.

With the loss of area air defence capabilities in 2015 (and, temporarily, at-sea replenishment capabilities), the RCN was, at that time, classified as a Rank 5 navy (offshore regional coastal defence) on the Todd-Lindberg navy classification system, dropping from Rank 3 (multiregional power projection). Commissioned vessels are designated as 'His Majesty's Canadian Ship' (HMCS), minor ships as 'Patrol Craft Training' (PCT) and auxiliaries as 'Canadian Forces Auxiliary Vessel' (CFAV).

Submarines

The Victoria class are British built diesel-electric fleet submarines designed in the late 1970s to supplement the Royal Navy's nuclear submarine force. They were decommissioned at the end of the Cold War. In 1998, Canada purchased the submarines to replace the aging s. Refit for Canadian service included the removal of Sub-Harpoon missile firing and mine-laying capabilities, installation of torpedo launch systems and upgrades to weapons and fire control systems. Each vessel holds 53 crew.

Frigates

The s are multi-role vessels with anti-submarine, anti-aircraft and anti-ship capability. In response to recent global security interests, the role of the class has shifted from open ocean to littoral engagement. Innovations in operational tactics have allowed the vessels of this class to adapt to new asymmetric surface threats. To ensure effective long-term capacity in this new threat environment the ships are undergoing a refit, including passive and active weapons, radars, and new combat architecture to meet the modern requirements. As of 2018, all twelve ships had been refitted. Each holds a complement of 225 officers and crew. All ships of the class are named after major Canadian cities.

Offshore patrol ships 
The s are warships from the Arctic and Offshore Patrol Ship (AOPS) procurement project, part of the National Shipbuilding Strategy. In July 2007 the federal government announced plans for acquiring six to eight icebreaking warships for the RCN. The class is based on the Norwegian Coast Guard ship , and is named after Vice Admiral Harry DeWolf. The class is equipped with a hangar and flight deck and can operate the Sikorsky CH-148 Cyclone. The ships can deploy with multiple payloads, including shipping containers, underwater survey equipment or landing craft and have a  crane for loading and unloading. They are for use in the Arctic regions of Canada for patrol and support within Canada's exclusive economic zone.

Maritime coastal defence vessels

The s are multi-role vessels built and launched from the mid- to late-1990s and are crewed by a combination of Naval Reserve and Regular-Force personnel. Each vessel displaces 970 t and runs with a complement of between 31 and 47 officers and crew. Their main missions are counter narcotics, coastal surveillance, sovereignty patrol, route survey, and training. The ships' capabilities include a mechanical minesweeping system, a route survey system, and a bottom object inspection vehicle.

Patrol & training vessels

s are primarily used for one-to-six-week long 'at sea' naval officer training. Regular force boatswains, engineers and naval communicators serve in these ships to train junior officers and non-commissioned sailors. They also patrol coastal waters for pollution infractions and fishing violations, and are frequently tasked for search and rescue operations. They operate year-round in the coastal waters of British Columbia.

Support and auxiliary vessels

Interim auxiliary replenishment vessel

Sail training ships

 (KC 480)
 HMSTV Goldcrest (KC 2355)
 HMSTV Tuna (KC 2372)

Torpedo and sound ranging vessels
CFAV Sikanni (YTP 611)
CFAV Stikine (YTP 613)

Yard diving tenders
Unnamed (YDT 11)
CFAV Granby (YDT 12)
CFAV Tonnerre (YDT 21)
CFAV Sechelt (YDT 610)
CFAV Sooke (YDT 612)

Fireboats
 (YTR 561) – retired in 2014 and awaiting disposal
 (YTR 562)

Tugboats

Yard auxiliary general
CFAV Pelican (YAG 4)
CFAV Gemini (YAG 650)
CFAV Pegasus (YAG 651)
CFAV Albatross (YAG 661)
CFAV Black Duck (YAG 660)

Development and procurement

The RCN is undergoing a complex program of capacity expansion, ship life extension, modernization and fleet procurement. The Nanisivik Naval Facility on Baffin Island in the arctic will provide shore services for fleet operations in the arctic during the four month summer season. The National Shipbuilding Procurement Strategy will invest more than $60 billion into the development of Arctic capable patrol vessels, frigate-class surface warships, and long-range auxiliary supply vessels. Delivery has been initiated on a class of six  vessels under the Arctic Patrol Ship Project. (A further two AOPS are planned for the Canadian Coast Guard). The commercial containership  is currently in service as a fleet supply vessel, to meet operational requirements until the two new s are completed. While up to 15 warships of the Canadian Surface Combatant/Type 26 frigate program remain in the planning stages, the RCN has upgraded all current frigates with advanced systems and life extension maintenance to maximize operational capability into the 2030s. In addition to the fleet component, the Canadian Armed Forces has replaced the former CH-124 Sea King helicopters with the CH-148 Cyclone. The first six Cyclones were delivered June 2015 followed by a further two Block 1.1 Cyclones in November/December 2015. As of May 2021, 23 Cyclones had been delivered and the aircraft had reached initial operating capability. In May 2019, it was announced that the Skeldar V-200 UAV would be acquired for both the RCN and Canadian Special Forces. As a light helicopter UAV, it will be capable of operating from a range of RCN vessels. On 29 April 2019 Ocean Industries was awarded a contract to build four tugboats to replace both the Fire-class fireboat (one retired in 2014) and Glen-class tugs to be delivered beginning in 2021.

Glossary

See also
 Royal Canadian Navy
 Origins of the Royal Canadian Navy
 History of the Royal Canadian Navy
 List of ships of the Royal Canadian Navy
 Hull classification symbol (Canada)
 His Majesty's Canadian Ship
 List of aircraft of the Royal Canadian Navy

References

Bibliography and further reading

 
 
 
 
 
 
 
 
 
 
 
 
 

 

 01
.
Royal Canadian Navy Ships Fleet
Canadian military-related lists